Dilbori is a village and union council (an administrative subdivision) of Mansehra District in Khyber Pakhtunkhwa province of Pakistan. It lies in area affected by the 2005 Kashmir earthquake.

References

External links 
 Ahmed Ali Khan

Union councils of Mansehra District
Populated places in Mansehra District